Mario Casaleggio (1877–1953) was an Italian stage and film actor.

Selected filmography
 Il signor Max (1937)
 Goodbye Youth (1940)
 Forbidden Music (1942)

References

Bibliography
 Goble, Alan. The Complete Index to Literary Sources in Film. Walter de Gruyter, 1999.

External links

1877 births
1953 deaths
Italian male stage actors
Italian male film actors
Actors from Turin